In the early hours of November 13, 2022, four University of Idaho students were fatally stabbed in their off-campus residence in Moscow, Idaho. On December 30, 28-year-old Bryan Christopher Kohberger was arrested in Monroe County, Pennsylvania, on four counts of murder in the first degree and felony burglary.

Background
Several University of Idaho students lived in a rented off-campus home in the rural college town of Moscow, Idaho. The three-story home had six bedrooms; two on each floor.

There had not been a murder in the city since 2015.

Events 
In the early morning hours of November 13, 2022, four University of Idaho college students were stabbed to death in a shared rental home close to campus, in which three of them resided. The three female victims—Madison Mogen, Kaylee Goncalves, and Xana Kernodle—lived at the house, while the fourth victim, Ethan Chapin, was Kernodle's boyfriend who was sleeping over on the night of the attacks. Two other female roommates also lived at the house; they were not attacked.

Earlier on the evening of November 12, two of the four victims, Chapin and Kernodle, were at an on-campus party at the nearby Sigma Chi fraternity from 8 pm to 9 pm. They returned home at 1:45 am. That evening, the other two victims, best friends Mogen and Goncalves, had gone to The Corner Club, a downtown sports bar at 10 pm, from which they departed at 1:30 am. The police later rephrased their statement to say the ride was provided by a "private party," arriving home at 1:56 am.

All four students were home by 1:56 am. Seven uncompleted phone calls were made from the phone of Goncalves to her former longtime boyfriend, a fellow student, from 2:26 to 2:52 am. Mogen also called the boyfriend three times with similar results from 2:44 to 2:52 am. These calls were investigated with the police concluding they did not believe he was involved in the crime. Kernodle received a DoorDash order around 4 am.

The two surviving roommates had returned home by 1 am, and original reports said they were in their beds on the ground floor of the home at the time of the killings. They were not attacked or held hostage, and original reports stated that both surviving roommates did not awaken during the killings. However, the affidavit for the case said that one surviving roommate was sleeping on the second floor, the same floor as Kernodle and Chapin, before she was awoken by what sounded like Goncalves and her dog. She later heard a roommate saying something to the effect of "there's someone here." The roommate believed this was said by Goncalves, although investigators also believe this might have been Kernodle speaking, as a forensic download of her cellphone showed that she was on the app TikTok at 4:12 am. The surviving roommate opened her door twice within a short span of time, and the second time, heard what sounded like crying coming from Kernodle's room and a male voice saying "it's okay, I'm going to help you." Security cameras near the home picked up the sound of whimpering, a loud thud, and a dog barking numerous times starting around 4:17 am. The surviving roommate opened her door a third time, and saw "a figure clad in black clothing and a mask that covered the person's mouth and nose walking towards her." The man, whom the roommate did not recognize, walked past her and used the sliding glass door to exit; it is unknown if the man saw her. The roommate stood in a "frozen shock phase" and then locked herself in her room. 

The four victims were stabbed to death on the second and third floors in the home, where they had been in bed. The victims were not gagged or restrained and the walls at the scene were spattered with blood. Mogen and Goncalves were found in Mogen's bedroom, and Kernodle and Chapin were found in Kernodle's room.

No calls to 911 were made until 11:58 am, many hours after the early morning killings. At that time a call was made from inside the residence, from the cellphone of one of the surviving students who lived at the residence, asking for aid for an "unconscious" person. When police arrived, the door to the home was open, there was no sign of forced entry or damage inside the home, and nothing appeared to be missing. The two surviving roommates were in the residence when the police arrived, as were other friends of the victims. The surviving roommates had called friends over to the home because they believed one of the second-floor victims was unconscious and was not waking up. The identity of the 911 caller was not released, and the person was not considered a suspect.

All four victims were pronounced deceased at 12 noon. Detectives believe the killings occurred sometime between 4 am and 4:25 am. That night officers came upon Goncalves's dog, which she shared with her ex-boyfriend, alive and unharmed at the house.

Victims
Four University of Idaho students were killed: Ethan Chapin, 20, of Conway, Washington; Kaylee Goncalves, 21, of Rathdrum, Idaho; Xana Kernodle, 20, of Avondale, Arizona (she later lived in Post Falls, Idaho); and Madison Mogen, 21, of Coeur d'Alene, Idaho. Chapin was a freshman, Kernodle was a junior, and Goncalves and Mogen were both seniors.

Response
On the evening of November 13, the university canceled classes for November 14; it also scheduled a candlelight vigil to be held on the UI administration building lawn on the evening of November 16, then postponed it two weeks. From the day of the killings, investigators initially said that there was no risk to the community. Three days later, however, Moscow Police Chief James Fry said: "We cannot say that there is no threat to the community."

Fall break was scheduled to begin after November 18, with classes resuming on November 28. Many students and other Moscow residents, not trusting the initial assurances of the police and fearing for their own safety, began an early Thanksgiving holiday exodus from the area. Other residents who stayed were anxious and cautious, and a number of professors canceled their classes. Because of weather concerns, the candlelight vigil was moved indoors to the Kibbie Dome and held on the evening of November 30.

The fathers of Goncalves and Chapin criticized the limited flow of information from the police and university to the families of the victims. TikTokers, self-proclaimed psychics, and social media users began to speculate and spread rumors and misinformation about the case on social media. In response the Moscow Police Department criticized Internet sleuths  for creating rampant online rumors and disrupting investigations, and in a December 2 news release said: "There is speculation, without factual backing, stoking community fears and spreading false facts." Moscow Police Captain Roger Lanier said "Tracking down rumors and quelling rumors about specific information and specific events that may not have happened is a huge distraction... We are not releasing specific details as we do not want to compromise the investigation." 

They also warned that "people harassing or threatening those potentially involved with the case could face criminal charges."

Investigation
The investigation of the stabbings is being conducted by the Moscow Police Department, supported by the Idaho State Police and the Latah County Sheriff's Office. In all, almost 130 members of law enforcement from the three agencies began working on the case.

The Latah County coroner conducted autopsies on the four victims on November 17. She said they all appeared to have been stabbed multiple times (with fatal wounds in the chest and upper body) with a large knife (if not the same knife, very similar ones). At least one victim (with what were apparently defensive stab wounds on her hands) and possibly more appear to have tried to fend off their attacker, and the victims may have been attacked while sleeping in their beds. None showed signs of sexual assault. All four deaths were deemed homicide by stabbing. The victims were not tied and gagged. No weapon has been recovered, although the police believe the killer or killers used a fixed-blade knife.

A surviving roommate who saw the suspect described him as a male stranger that was around 5 feet 10 inches, and "not very muscular, but athletically built with bushy eyebrows".

On November 19, police requested the public provide any video of the house that had been recorded the night of the killings. A phone tip line and email were created for students and others to submit potential evidence to officials. As of December 5, it was reported that there had been more than 2,600 emailed tips, 2,700 phone calls, and 1,000 digital media submissions from the public to these tip lines. On December 24, the investigative team reported having received at least 15,000 tips regarding the case.

The police initially left open the possibility that there could be more than one perpetrator. Police stated that they believe it was "a targeted attack but have not concluded if the target was the residence or its occupants." In a November 23 press conference, the Moscow police chief said that authorities had received a number of tips including that Goncalves allegedly had a stalker, but were unable to verify that claim or identify any such individual at that time.

After receiving hundreds of tips from the public, on December 15 police announced they were searching records of approximately 22,000 fifth-generation Hyundai Elantras that were made between 2010 and 2015. A camera in the area of the killings had captured an image of an Elantra around the time when the killings happened. Investigators noticed that the white Hyundai Elantra that was captured by a camera during the time of the killings appeared to travel in the direction of Pullman, Washington, and twice to the apartment of the victims. Surveillance video also showed an Elantra passing by the victims' home three times, beginning around 3:29 am. At 4:04 am, the Elantra returned to the home for a fourth time. At 4:20 am, the vehicle was seen leaving the victims' neighborhood "at a high rate of speed."

Investigators traced the ownership of this vehicle to a local individual, Bryan Kohberger, who drove the car with his father to the Pocono Mountains of Pennsylvania for the holidays. He was pulled over twice within a nearly five-mile radius by Indiana State Police on Interstate 70 outside Greenfield, Indiana, for speeding and tailgating. The FBI denied allegations that they had directed the Indiana State Police to make the stops. Investigators obtained cellphone data that showed that Kohberger's phone stopped connecting to the network around 2:47 am in Pullman on November 13 before reconnecting around 4:48 am near Blaine, Idaho, which is near U.S. Highway 95 south of Moscow. Cellphone data also shows that he was near the victims' residence around 9 am on November 13, approximately five hours after the killings. Police also obtained data that indicated that he was near the residence at least 12 times between June 2022 and November 13. Investigators had additionally obtained a sample of DNA from the crime scene that did not belong to any of the victims. The DNA was found on a tan leather knife sheath on Mogen's bed.  Using a public genealogy database, authorities identified a partial match to an individual with a familial connection to Kohberger. Investigators then traced the DNA to Kohberger by matching it to DNA found on the trash that was recovered from his family's home in Pennsylvania.

Prior to the arrest, investigators monitored Kohberger outside of his parents' Pennsylvania home. He was seen multiple times wearing surgical gloves and observed putting trash bags inside of the garbage can of a neighbor. The items were sent to the Idaho State Lab for testing. Authorities also said Kohberger had "cleaned his car, inside and outside, not missing an inch [of area]." According to authorities, a search of the home where Kohberger was arrested revealed a knife, a pistol, and black face mask.

At the time of his arrest, authorities found Kohberger in the kitchen dressed in a shirt and shorts, while wearing examination gloves and putting trash into a separate zip lock baggies.

Accused
A 28-year-old man, Bryan Christopher Kohberger was taken into custody by an FBI SWAT team and Pennsylvania State Police on December 30 at the home of his parents in Monroe County, Pennsylvania. Kohberger was born on November 21, 1994 in Albrightsville, Pennsylvania, and his parents are natives of Brooklyn, New York.

Shortly after finishing Pleasant Valley High School in 2013, he attended Monroe Career and Technical Institute in Bartonsville but dropped out a year later. Kohberger later attended Northampton Community College in Bethlehem, where he earned an associate degree in psychology in 2018. After graduating from Northampton, he worked as a security guard for the Pleasant Valley School District, the same school district where his father previously worked as a maintenance worker for many years and his mother for a time as a substitute teacher. He received a B.A. in 2020 and an M.A. in 2022 in Criminal Justice from DeSales University, in Center Valley, Pennsylvania. 

At the time of the killings, he was a doctoral student in criminology and had completed his first semester there nine days before his arrest. Kohberger had been a teaching assistant at WSU, and less than two weeks before the murders, faculty members met with him to discuss growing concerns about his behavior and conduct. Kohberger was terminated from his teaching assistant role on December 19 with the decision being based on "his unsatisfactory performance as a teaching assistant, including his failure to meet the 'norms of professional behavior' in his interactions with the faculty."

Arrest
Kohberger was arrested on four counts of first-degree murder and one felony count of burglary, was appointed a public defender, and detained without bond at the Monroe County Correctional Facility in Stroudsburg, Pennsylvania. On his return to the county courthouse on January 3, 2023, he agreed to extradition. On January 4, he was flown to Pullman, driven to the Latah County jail in Moscow, and held without bail.

Kohberger made his first appearance in the Latah County Courthouse on January 5, and was charged with four counts of first-degree murder and one count of burglary, for breaking into a home with the intent to commit a felony. One week later on January 12, Kohberger made his second appearance for a status conference in the same room at the courthouse. A preliminary probable cause hearing was scheduled for June 26 at the same courthouse.

Aftermath
On February 24, 2023, University of Idaho president C. Scott Green announced that the house where the killings occurred was donated to the university; the house will be demolished. Scholarships in the name of three of the victims (Kernodle, Chapin, and Mogen) have been created. A memorial garden for the victims on the University of Idaho campus is being planned.

See also
List of attacks related to post-secondary schools

References

2022 in Idaho
Attacks in the United States in 2022
Deaths by stabbing in Idaho
Knife attacks
Mass stabbings in the United States
Moscow, Idaho
November 2022 crimes in the United States
Stabbing attacks in 2022
Unsolved crimes in the United States
Unsolved mass murders in the United States
Violence against women in the United States
Killings